This is a survey of the postage stamps and postal history of Zanzibar.

Zanzibar is a semi-autonomous part of the United Republic of Tanzania, in East Africa. It comprises most of the Zanzibar Archipelago in the Indian Ocean.

The islands were once governed by the Zanzibar Sultanate, a sovereign state with a long trading history within the Arab world. In 1964 it united with Tanganyika to form Tanzania.

First stamps 

Before dedicated Zanzibar stamps could be manufactured, Indian stamps were sometimes locally overprinted, at the offices of the Zanzibar Gazette, which had the only printing press in the territory. Any Indian stamps or covers used in Zanzibar between 1854 and 1876 are rare.  A post office under Indian administration provided postal services from late 1868 through early 1869.  This was re-opened 1 October 1875 as a foreign post office having special relations with the Indian Post Office, and the use of Indian stamps was required.

By treaty in 1862, Great Britain, France and Germany had agreed to respect the independence of Zanzibar.  However, in 1890 the Sultanate, including Pemba and a ten-mile wide strip of land along the coast, placed itself under the protection of Great Britain.  On November 10, 1895 the post office was transferred to British East African administration. Indian stamps overprinted "Zanzibar" were issued in 1895.

In addition to the Zanzibar post office, there were six other post offices on Zanzibar and three offices on Pemba.  A French post office operated from January 16, 1889 to July 31, 1904, and a German postal agency operated from August 27, 1890 to July 31, 1891.

Later issues 
The first set of definitives was issued in 1896 depicting the Sultan. Zanzibar issued stamps as a British protectorate until regaining independence in 1963. When the sultanate was overthrown and a republic established in 1964, stamps were overprinted "JAMHURI" (Swahili for 'republic').

After Zanzibar joined Tanganyika to form Tanzania, stamps were issued until 1967.

See also 
French post offices in Zanzibar
German post offices abroad
Postage stamps and postal history of British East Africa
Postage stamps and postal history of German East Africa
Postage stamps and postal history of Tanzania
Revenue stamps of Zanzibar

References

Further reading 
DuBro, Gary. Zanzibar's Postal History Legacy.  Bristol: BPA Expertising Educational Charity, 2012,  214p.
 Griffith-Jones, John. The Postage Dues of Zanzibar 1875-1964: The Stamps, The Covers and Their Story. Bristol: BPA Expertising Education Charity, 2014  539p.
 Hall, Thomas William, Sir John Wilson and John Minns. Zanzibar 1895-1904: a comprehensive study of the stamps and postal stationery including the Zanzibar overprints and surcharges on Indian postage stamps 1895-96; the Zanzibar overprints on postage stamps of British East Africa, and the Sultan issues from 1896 to the Arms issue of 1904. London: East Africa Study Circle, 2002  89p.
Proud, Ted. The Postal History of Uganda and Zanzibar. Heathfield, Sussex: Postal History Publications Co., 1993.  433p.

External links

http://www.stampdomain.com/country/tanzania/display.htm
https://web.archive.org/web/20100818092700/http://www.rpsl.org.uk/uganda_zanzibar/index.html

Philately of Tanzania